Breidis Enrique Prescott Consuegra (born May 3, 1983) is a Colombian professional boxer. In his early career he had a reputation as a formidable puncher, winning 18 of his first 20 fights by knockout. In 2008, Prescott first became known on the world stage when he upset heavily favoured and then-undefeated Olympian Amir Khan, which gave rise to Prescott's nickname of "The Khanqueror". His younger brother Daulis Prescott is also a professional boxer.

Amateur career
As an amateur, Prescott represented Colombia at the 2003 Pan American Games, where he was stopped in the first round by Lucas Matthysse of Argentina. In 2022, Prescott went back to amateur boxing and tried to win the WBL welterweight title which after three rounds was defeated by Richard Willows by unanimous decision.

Professional career
Prescott made his professional debut on July 1, 2005, stopping Oscar Pineda in the first round. In his next seventeen fights, Prescott would win all but one by knockout or stoppage. On June 27, 2008, Prescott made his United States debut against Richar Abril, winning a ten-round split decision. Prescott would make headlines on September 6, when he travelled to England to face 2004 Olympic silver medalist Amir Khan. In a major upset, Prescott knocked Khan out in less than a minute into the first round to win his first regional championship, the WBO Inter-Continental lightweight title.

2009 was not as successful for Prescott, despite continuing to garner worldwide exposure to boxing audiences. On February 20, he defeated Humberto Toledo after the latter was disqualified in the tenth and final round for biting Prescott on the shoulder. On July 17, Miguel Vázquez handed Prescott his first professional loss by frustrating him with his highly awkward style, despite himself being knocked down in the first round. The bout was ruled a ten-round split decision in favour of Vázquez, but the lone scorecard for Prescott was seen as controversial.

A second consecutive loss for Prescott occurred on December 5 during his second visit to England, as Kevin Mitchell won a wide unanimous decision with the now-vacant WBO Inter-Continental lightweight title on the line. Prescott returned to winning ways in 2010 and early 2011, scoring three wins with ease, but on September 10, 2011, he lost a close twelve-round unanimous decision to Paul McCloskey in England. This was followed by a dramatic loss on what would be Prescott's biggest stage to date, as part of the undercard to Manny Pacquiao vs. Juan Manuel Márquez III on November 12, 2011.  In what was described as a thriller, Prescott went to war with fellow power-puncher Mike Alvarado, outworking him in the first half of the fight. However, in the tenth and final round, Prescott was knocked down and then hurt by a series of punches from Alvarado, which forced the referee to stop the fight.

In 2012, Prescott bounced back by winning two fights, but in 2013 would endure his fifth loss, this time to undefeated prospect Terence Crawford, who won a clear ten-round unanimous decision. Since then, he has lost 12 of his next 17 bouts.

Professional boxing record

References

External links

1983 births
Living people
Sportspeople from Barranquilla
Lightweight boxers
Light-welterweight boxers
Welterweight boxers
Pan American Games competitors for Colombia
Boxers at the 2003 Pan American Games
Colombian male boxers
21st-century Colombian people